Karina Smulders is a Dutch stage, television and film actress.

Selected filmography
 Wild Romance (2006)
 Bride Flight (2008)
 Alle tijd (2011)
 Speak No Evil (2022)

References

Bibliography
 Ian Haydn Smith. TCM International Film Guide 2008: The Definitive Annual Review of World Cinema. Wallflower Press, 2008.

External links

1980 births
Living people
Dutch film actresses
Dutch stage actresses
Dutch television actresses
Actors from Utrecht (city)
21st-century Dutch actresses
Dutch soap opera actresses